Anabathridae is a family of sea snails, marine gastropod molluscs in the order Littorinimorpha.

Genera 
 Genus Afriscrobs W.F. Ponder, 1983
Afriscrobs adjacens (E. A. Smith, 1910)
Afriscrobs africanus (Bartsch, 1915)
Afriscrobs minutissimus (Turton, 1932)
Afriscrobs muiri (Barnard, 1963)
Afriscrobs quantilla (Turton, 1932)
Afriscrobs saldadinensis (Hornung & Mermod, 1928)
Afriscrobs turtoni (Bartsch, 1915)
Genus Amphithalamus Carpenter, 1864
 Genus Anabathron G.R. von Frauenfeld, 1867
 sometimes there are recognized subgenera Anabathron G.R. von Frauenfeld, 1867 and Scrobs Watson, 1886
Anabathron angulatum (Powell, 1927)
Anabathron ascensum Hedley, 1907
†Anabathron bartrumi (Laws, 1950)
†Anabathron chattonensis (Laws, 1948)
Anabathron contabulatum Frauenfeld, 1867
Anabathron elongatum (Powell, 1927)
Anabathron excelsum (Powell, 1933)
Anabathron hedleyi (Suter, 1908)
†Anabathron kaawaensis (Laws, 1936)
†Anabathron latoscrobis (Laws, 1948)
Anabathron lene Hedley, 1918
Anabathron luteofuscum (May, 1919)
Anabathron ovatum (Powell, 1927)
Anabathron pluteus (Laseron, 1950)
†Anabathron praeco (Laws, 1941)
†Anabathron quartus (Laws, 1950)
Anabathron rugulosum (Powell, 1930)
Anabathron scrobiculator (Watson, 1886)
†Anabathron scrobis (Laws, 1950)
Anabathron trailli (Powell, 1939)
 Genus Badepigrus Iredale, 1955
 Genus Microdryas C.F. Laseron, 1950
 Genus Microfossa C.F. Laseron
 Genus Nodulus Monterosato, 1878
 Genus Pisinna T.A. di Monterosato, 1878
Pisinna glabrata von Mühlfeldt, 1824
Pisinna impressa (Hutton, 1885) 
 Genus Pseudestea W.F. Ponder, 1967
Pseudestea crassiconus (Powell, 1933)
Pseudestea pyramidata (Hedley, 1903)
Genera brought into synonymy
 Estea Iredale, 1915: synonym of Pisinna Monterosato, 1878
 Hagenmulleria Bourguignat, 1881: synonym of Pisinna Monterosato, 1878
 Nannoscrobs Finlay, 1926: synonym of Scrobs Watson, 1886: synonym of Anabathron Frauenfeld, 1867
 Pisanna: synonym of Pisinna Monterosato, 1878
 Scrobs Watson, 1886: synonym of Anabathron Frauenfeld, 1867

References 

 The Taxonomicon
 Costello, M.J.; Emblow, C.; White, R. (Ed.). (2001). European register of marine species: a check-list of the marine species in Europe and a bibliography of guides to their identification. Collection Patrimoines Naturels, 50. Muséum national d'Histoire Naturelle: Paris, France. . 463 pp.

External links